Robert Marcel Tréboux (October 21, 1924 Vinzier - August 22, 2012), was one of the last surviving influential chefs and restaurateurs to come to New York City from France to work at Le Pavillon. With his death, Time declared the era of la cuisine classique to be over.

Career
He was sixteen when he went to work as a waiter at his cousin's hotel in Paris before going to work at La Selle, also in Paris and Claridge's in London. At some point, he was promoted to captain. He met a New York judge who sponsored him to come to the United States where he worked at Pavillon for five years. When he went to work at Maud Chez Elle, he moved to the front of the house. 
 
He opened Le Manoir late in the 1950s. He also opened Le Clos Normand and La Rotisserie Française, one of the first restaurants with an open kitchen.

Treboux bought the Manhattan restaurant in 1985. When he passed away, daughter Catherine Treboux until she sold it in 2019.

References

1921 births
2012 deaths
French restaurateurs
American restaurateurs
People from Haute-Savoie